Vijayani Vithanage (born 4 August 1975) is a Sri Lankan-born Canadian woman cricketer. She played for Canada at the 2013 ICC Women's World Twenty20 Qualifier. She represent Canada-XI in  2022 Women's South American Cricket tournament, where all the matches involving Canada did not have a T20I status.

References

External links 
 

1975 births
Living people
Canadian women cricketers
Canadian people of Sri Lankan descent
Sri Lankan expatriates in Canada
Sportspeople from Kurunegala